Unionville is a census-designated place (CDP) in Tift County, Georgia, United States. The population was 2,074 at the 2000 census.

History
Unionville took its name in the 1880s from the Union Lumber Company.

Geography
Unionville is located at  (31.435302, -83.508824).

Demographics

2020 census

As of the 2020 United States census, there were 1,688 people, 651 households, and 318 families residing in the CDP.

2000 census
At the 2000 census, there were 2,074 people, 750 households and 521 families residing in the CDP. The racial makeup of the CDP was 1.45% White, 96.96% African American, 0.05% Native American, 0.05% Asian, 0.68% from other races, and 0.82% from two or more races. Hispanic or Latino of any race were 1.16% of the population.

There were 750 households, of which 30.5% had children under the age of 18 living with them, 32.3% were married couples living together, 30.8% had a female householder with no husband present, and 30.5% were non-families. 25.5% of all households were made up of individuals, and 11.3% had someone living alone who was 65 years of age or older. The average household size was 2.77 and the average family size was 3.37.

29.2% of the population were under the age of 18, 10.2% from 18 to 24, 26.0% from 25 to 44, 21.3% from 45 to 64, and 13.4% who were 65 years of age or older. The median age was 34 years. For every 100 females, there were 87.0 males. For every 100 females age 18 and over, there were 75.7 males.

The median household income was $23,430 and the median family income was $23,372. Males had a median income of $22,143 compared with  $19,223 for females. The per capita income was $11,699. About 33.4% of families and 33.1% of the population were below the poverty line, including 36.3% of those under age 18 and 32.2% of those age 65 or over.

In 2010, Unionville had the 17th-lowest median household income of all places in the United States with a population over 1,000.

References

Census-designated places in Tift County, Georgia
Census-designated places in Georgia (U.S. state)